is a junction railway station in the town of Iwate, Iwate, Japan, operated by JR East for the Tohoku Shinkansen and the third-sector railway operator Iwate Ginga Railway Company for local services.

Lines
Iwate-Numakunai Station is served by both the Tohoku Shinkansen and the Iwate Ginga Railway Line. It is located 32.0 rail kilometers from the terminus of the Iwate Ginga Railway Line at Morioka Station and 566.2 rail kilometers from Tokyo Station by the Tōhoku Shinkansen.

Station layout
The JR East Iwate-Numakunai Station has a four-story station building, with two elevated opposed  side platforms on the fourth floor. The platforms have chest-high platform edge doors. The station has a Midori no Madoguchi staffed ticket office.

The adjacent Iwate Ginga Railway Station has a ground level island platform and a single side platform connected to the three-story station building by an overhead crossing. The station is staffed.

Platforms

Connecting bus routes
JR Bus Tōhoku
For Kuji Station via Kuzumaki
For Morioka Station
Iwate Kenhoku Bus via Iwate-Shibutami
For Morioka Bus Center via Morioka Station

History
It was absorbed into the JR East network upon the privatization of the Japanese National Railways (JNR) on 1 April 1987 and was transferred to the Iwate Ginga Railway on 1 September 2002. Services on the Tohoku Shinkansen commenced 1 December 2002. The station was renamed Iwate-Numakunai at that time.

Passenger statistics
In fiscal 2018, the JR East portion of the station was used by an average of 83 passengers daily (boarding passengers only). The Iwate Ginga Railway portion of the station was used by an average of 869 passengers daily.

Surrounding area
 Iwate-Numakunai Eki-mae Post Office

See also
 List of railway stations in Japan

References

External links

  (JR East) 
 Iwatenumakunai Station information  

Railway stations in Iwate Prefecture
Tōhoku Shinkansen
Iwate Galaxy Railway Line
Railway stations in Japan opened in 1891
Iwate, Iwate